True Fire is a song cycle for solo baritone and orchestra by the Finnish composer Kaija Saariaho.  The work was jointly commissioned by the Los Angeles Philharmonic, the NDR Symphony Orchestra, the BBC Symphony Orchestra and the Orchestre National de France.  It was first performed at the Walt Disney Concert Hall in Los Angeles on May 14, 2015, by the baritone Gerald Finley and Los Angeles Philharmonic under the conductor Gustavo Dudamel.  The piece is dedicated to Gerald Finley.

Composition
True Fire has a duration of roughly 25 minutes and is composed in six movements:
Proposition I
River
Proposition II
Lullaby
Farewell
Proposition III

The first movement "Proposition I" is based on a reflection by the essayist and poet Ralph Waldo Emerson.  The second movement "River" is based on a text by the poet Seamus Heaney.  "Proposition II" is also based on a text by Emerson and was described by the composer as "the heart of the piece."  The fourth movement "Lullaby" is based on a traditional Native American song.  "Farewell" draws the piece into a darker mood before the final movement "Proposition III" concludes the piece with a "sensation of weightless energy".  Additional text in the piece is taken from the poetry of Mahmoud Darwish.

Saariaho described her intent for piece in the score program note, writing, "My preliminary idea was to explore the baritone voice in the context of various texts, finding an organic way to access the different colors of the voice through the texts."

Instrumentation
The work is scored for solo baritone and an orchestra comprising three flutes (doubling piccolo and alto flute), two oboes, three clarinets (doubling bass clarinet), two bassoons (doubling contrabassoon), four horns, three trumpets, three trombones, tuba, timpani, three percussionists, harp, and strings.

Reception
True Fire has been praised by music critics.  Reviewing the world premiere, Mark Swed of the Los Angeles Times wrote, "The performance was strong. Dudamel remained constantly attuned to Saariaho's vastly changeable instrumental colors, a cosmic sonic background for Finley, who handled each song with operatic intensity, part of a grand psychodrama of searching for meaning, for words that can obtain meaning through music but can also become emptied of meaning when sung."  He added, "This is a profound, important work."  Henry Schlinger of Culture Spot LA observed, "...the orchestral writing was superb, plumbing the depths of the color and timbre, and the LA Phil pulled it off splendidly. Compositions like True Fire have to be heard and seen in person; it is almost like performance art."

Conversely, Donna Perlmutter of LA Observed gave the piece a negative review, remarking, "True Fire [...] was overly long at 30 minutes, considering its unrelieved, dirge-like stretches of doom and gloom. Singer Gerald Finley has had more grateful opportunities and the merely respectful audience buzzed with conspicuous naysayers afterward in the lobby."

References

Compositions by Kaija Saariaho
2014 compositions
Classical song cycles in English
Compositions for symphony orchestra
Music commissioned by the Los Angeles Philharmonic